The fifth season of The Fresh Prince of Bel-Air premiered on September 19, 1994 and concluded on May 15, 1995. Ross Bagley was added to the show's cast, playing a now preschool-aged Nicky Banks despite the character being a newborn infant in the previous season. This is common in television series and soap operas. In the first episode to feature this change, Jazz expresses amazement while Will just stares uneasily into the camera.

Episodes 

 Will Smith, James Avery, Alfonso Ribeiro, Karyn Parsons, and Joseph Marcell were present for all episodes.
 Tatyana M. Ali was absent for one episode.
 Daphne Maxwell Reid was absent for eight episodes.
 Ross Bagley was present for thirteen episodes.
 DJ Jazzy Jeff was present for twelve episodes.
 Vernee Watson-Johnson was present for two episodes.
 Nia Long was present for fifteen episodes.
 Bernie Kopell was present for one episode.
 John Beradino was present for one episode.
 Doctor Dré was present for one episode.
 Erick Avari was present for one episode.
 Debra Mooney was present for one episode.
 Kathleen McClellan was present for one episode.
 Macon McCalman was present for one episode.
 Milton Berle was present for one episode.
 Nancy Giles was present for two episodes.
 Arthel Neville was present for two episodes.
 Johari Johnson was present for two episodes.

External links 
 
 

1994 American television seasons
1995 American television seasons
The Fresh Prince of Bel-Air seasons